Jacques Morel (29 May 1922 in Paris – 9 April 2008 in Paris) was a French film and television actor.  He was, perhaps, best known as the French language voice of the cartoon character, Obelix, in the animated adaptation of the comic book, Asterix.

Jacques Morel died in Paris, France, on 9 April 2008, at the age of 85.

Partial filmography 

 L'aventure est au coin de la rue (1944) - L'homme mystérieuse
 Alone in the Night (1945) - Melor
 Toute la famille était là (1948) - Villediou
 Between Eleven and Midnight (1949) - Bouture
 Au p'tit zouave (1950) - Félix Lambert
 Voyage à trois (1950) - Maurice
 The Girl from Maxim's (1950) - Le docteur Petypon
 L'homme de joie (1951) - Edouard Jolivet
 Les joueurs (1951, TV Movie)
 Topaze (1951) - Régis Castel-Vernac
 Victor (1951) - Jacques Genoust
 Le Dindon (1951) - Vatelin
 La poison (1951) - (voice)
 Au fil des ondes (1951) - Himself
 We Are All Murderers (1952) - Charles
 Une fille dans le soleil (1953) - Boissières
 Un trésor de femme (1953) - Albert Brunet
 Les amours finissent à l'aube (1953) - Van Goffin
 Rue de l'Estrapade (1953) - Marcel
 Une nuit à Megève (1953) - Léon
 Mandat d'amener (1953) - Gaston
 Royal Affairs in Versailles (1954) - Bohmer (uncredited)
 After You Duchess (1954) - Armand
 Les hommes ne pensent qu'à ça (1954) - Le parfait séducteur
 Service Entrance (1954) - Georges Dumény
 The Grand Maneuver (1955) - Monsieur Monnet
 Môme Pigalle (1955) - Monsieur Maugeat
 Si Paris nous était conté (1956) - Le gouverneur Jourdan
 Marie Antoinette Queen of France (1956) - Louis XVI
 Elena and Her Men (1956) - Duchêne
 Folies-Bergère (1956) - Roland
 The Seventh Commandment (1957) - Pilou
 Les suspects (1957) - Inspecteur Paul Duchamp
 A Certain Monsieur Jo (1958) - Inspecteur Loriot
 Sacrée jeunesse (1958) - Étienne Longué
 Life Together (1958) - Claude
 Madame et son auto (1958) - Victor Martini
 Clara et les méchants (1959) - Charlemagne
 Drôles de phénomènes (1959) - Jérôme Dandaine
 Maigret et l'Affaire Saint-Fiacre (1959) - Maître Mauléon
 Le panier à crabes (1960) - Le producteur
 À rebrousse-poil (1961) - M. Durand
 L'imprevisto (1961) - Inspector Chattard
 Rencontres (1962) - David
 Man from Cocody (1965) - Rouffignac
 Les mordus de Paris (1965)
 La corde au cou (1965) - Le chauffeur de taxi
 Pleins feux sur Stanislas (1965) - Le percepteur
 Asterix the Gaul (1967) - Obelix (voice)
 Asterix and Cleopatra (1968) - Obelix (voice)
 L'auvergnat et l'autobus (1969) - Kleinfuchs
 The Twelve Tasks of Asterix (1976) - Obelix (voice)
 Ça fait tilt (1978) - Francis
 L'exercice du pouvoir (1978) - Albert Larchat
 La Ballade des Dalton (1978) - Sam Game, le prêcheur et tricheur repenti (voice)
 L'amour en question (1978) - Le Président
 Julien Fontanes, magistrat (1980-1989, TV Series) - Juge Julien Fontane (final appearance)

References

External links 

1922 births
2008 deaths
Male actors from Paris
French male film actors
French male voice actors